Estadio Alfredo Ramos is a football stadium in Agronomía, Buenos Aires, Argentina.  It is the home ground of Comunicaciones.  The stadium holds 3,500 people and was opened on 29 September 1962. 

Its name is a heartfelt tribute to Alfredo Ramos, who was president of the Club for 14 years.

External links
Image of the stadium

Football venues in Argentina
Sports venues in Buenos Aires